The 2017–18 season was Dundee's fourth consecutive season in the top flight of Scottish football since their promotion at the end of the 2013–14 season. Dundee were knocked out of the League Cup in a 4–0 defeat by Celtic, and were knocked out of Fifth round of the Scottish Cup by Motherwell.

Competitions

Premiership

Results

Scottish Cup

League Cup

Results

Team statistics

Appearances

|-
|colspan="14"|Players who left the club during the season:

|}

Goal scorers

Squad statistics

League table

Group C Table

Second Place Table

Transfers

In

Out

See also
 List of Dundee F.C. seasons

Notes

References

Dundee F.C. seasons
Dundee